Fernandoa is a genus of plants in the family Bignoniaceae.

Species include:
Fernandoa abbreviata Bidgood
Fernandoa adenophylla (Wall. ex G.Don) Steenis
Fernandoa adolfi-friderici Gilg & Mildbr.
Fernandoa bracteata (Dop) Steenis
Fernandoa brilletii (Dop) Steenis
Fernandoa coccinea (Scott-Elliot) A.H.Gentry
Fernandoa collignonii (Dop) Steenis
Fernandoa ferdinandi (Welw.) Baill. ex K.Schum.
Fernandoa guangxiensis D.D.Tao
Fernandoa lutea (Verdc.) Bidgood
Fernandoa macrantha (Baker) A.H.Gentry
Fernandoa macroloba (Miq.) Steenis
Fernandoa madagascariensis (Baker) A.H.Gentry
Fernandoa magnifica Seem.
Fernandoa serrata (Dop) Steenis

References

 
Bignoniaceae genera
Taxonomy articles created by Polbot